Ian Wallace  (born 1943) is a British-born Canadian artist, living and working in Vancouver, British Columbia. Wallace has been an influential figure in the development of an internationally acknowledged photographic and conceptual art practice in Vancouver since 1965.

Artistic practice
Wallace has exhibited painting and photography nationally and internationally since 1965. He is known for juxtaposing monochrome painting and photography in a way that problematizes the differences between the two mediums, referencing aesthetic and social issues through themes of the studio, the museum and the street.

Education and teaching
Wallace taught Art History at the University of British Columbia from 1967 to 1970, and then at the Vancouver School of Art (now Emily Carr University of Art and Design) from 1972 to 1998, where he taught a contemporary art course titled Art Now that was one of the earliest to introduce the art of the recent past into the art history curriculum. As a professor, he has had a significant role in shaping the contemporary art scene and advised artist, such as Kelly Wood.  Through his emphasis on the importance of a knowledge of art history, his support for visiting artist programs, and his progressive courses that examined the common history of various media including film, photography, and painting, Wallace influenced a generation of artists emerging from the Vancouver scene, including members of the so-called Vancouver School of artists, Jeff Wall, Ken Lum, Stan Douglas, Roy Arden and Rodney Graham.

Awards 
In 2004, Wallace received a Governor General's Awards in Visual and Media Arts.
He was also named an Officer of the Order of Canada, second highest honour for merit, in December 2012. In 2016 he was inducted into the Royal Canadian Academy of Arts.

Gallery

Bibliography 
 Ian Wallace: At the Intersection of Painting and Photography, Vancouver Art Gallery, Vancouver and Black Dog Publishing, London UK, 2012
 Tropismes, Galerie Greta Meert, 2012 
 Ian Wallace: The Economy of the Image, The Power Plant, Toronto, 2010
 Ian Wallace: A Literature of Images, Kunsthalle Zürich, Kunstverein für die Rheinlande und Westflen, Düsseldorf, Witte de With, co-published by Sternberg Press, 2008
 In the Studio: Ian Wallace, Vancouver: Charles H. Scott Gallery, 2007
 Ian Wallace: Clayoquot Protest, Sprengel Museum Hannover, 1998 
 Ian Wallace: The Idea of the University, Vancouver: Fine Arts Gallery, University of British Columbia, 1990
 Ian Wallace: Images, Saint Étienne: Maison de la Culture, 1989
 Ian Wallace: Selected Works, 1970 - 1987, Vancouver: Vancouver Art Gallery, 1988

References

1943 births
Living people
Artists from Vancouver
Canadian photographers
Academic staff of the University of British Columbia
Canadian conceptual artists
Governor General's Award in Visual and Media Arts winners
Officers of the Order of Canada
Members of the Royal Canadian Academy of Arts